The Socata ST-10 Diplomate was a French four-seat civil light aircraft. It was a development of the GY-80 Horizon, and was initially known as the Super Horizon 200, later the Provence, before finally being named the ST-10 Diplomate. The first prototype flew on 7 November 1967, production beginning in 1970. Production ended in 1974, with a total of 56 built.

Specifications (ST-10)

See also

References

External links

 Airliners.net

1960s French civil utility aircraft
ST 10
Single-engined tractor aircraft
Aircraft first flown in 1967